Verkhnecherekulevo (Ürge Serekkül) is a rural locality (a village) in Cherekulevsky Selsoviet, Ilishevsky District, Bashkortostan, Russia. The population was 402 as of 2010. There are 29 streets.

Geography 
Verkhnecherekulevo is located 7 km northeast of Verkhneyarkeyevo (the district's administrative centre) by road. Nizhneyarkeyevo is the nearest rural locality.

References 

Rural localities in Ilishevsky District